The Mobfather is the ninth studio album by American rapper C-Bo, released July 22, 2003 on West Coast Mafia Records. The album features production by Blaqtoven, Bosko, Jellyroll and Rhythm D. It peaked at number 37 on the Billboard Top R&B/Hip-Hop Albums and at number 13 on the Billboard Independent Albums. The album features guest performances by 40 Glocc, Killa Tay, Phats Bossi, Yukmouth and Tha Realest.

Track listing 
"Intro	(featuring Fed-X) - 3:04
"If U Don't Know About Me" - 4:20
"I Like Gangster Shit" (featuring Gotti & Eastwood)- 4:22
"Hustlin'" (featuring 40 Glocc, Crunch & Young Meek) - 4:05
"We Come From tha Streets" - 4:34
"C-BO & The Realest" (featuring Tha Realest) - 3:53
"Goin Hard" (featuring Gotti & Killa Tay) - 3:23
"What U Want Nigga?" - 4:01
"WCM Radio A.M. (Skit)" - 0:29
"Don't Want It" (featuring Lil' Bo, Thug Misses & Vitnomb) - 4:09
"Know Where to Find Me" (featuring Crunch) - 4:49
"So Fresh" (featuring 151 & Yukmouth) - 5:05
"I'm a..." - 4:37
"Box U Out!" (featuring 151, KJ & Truck) - 4:18
"WCM Radio P.M. (Skit)" - 0:51
"I Got Mine" (featuring Madd Maxx, Phats Bossi, Vitnomb & Gotti) - 5:09
"Weekends" (featuring Bosko) - 3:52
"Been Through So Much" - 4:03
"Roll Wit Me" - 3:43
"Bitch Nigga (Skit)" - 1:28
"Bitch Niggaz" (featuring Lil' Cyco) - 3:43

Chart history

References

External links 
The Mobfather at Discogs
The Mobfather at MusicBrainz

C-Bo albums
2003 albums
Albums produced by JellyRoll
Albums produced by Bosko
Albums produced by Rhythum D
Self-released albums